Kürşat Duymuş, (born 1 February 1979 in Muş, Turkey) is a retired Turkish football defender.

Duymuş previously played for Şekerspor, Çaykur Rizespor, Ankaraspor, Beşiktaş, Trabzonspor, Kayseri Erciyesspor and Orduspor.

External links

1979 births
Living people
Turkish footballers
Turkey B international footballers
Beşiktaş J.K. footballers
Çaykur Rizespor footballers
Kayseri Erciyesspor footballers
Orduspor footballers
Akhisarspor footballers
Süper Lig players
People from Muş
Turkey international footballers
Association football defenders